The geography of New York City is characterized by its coastal position at the meeting of the Hudson River and the Atlantic Ocean in a naturally sheltered harbor. The city's geography, with its scarce availability of land, is a contributing factor in making New York the most densely populated major city in the United States. Environmental issues are chiefly concerned with managing this density, which also explains why New York is among the most energy-efficient and least automobile-dependent cities in the United States. The city's climate is temperate.

Geography 

New York City is located on the coast of the Northeastern United States at the mouth of the Hudson River in southeastern New York state. It is located in the New York–New Jersey Harbor Estuary, the centerpiece of which is the New York Harbor, whose deep waters and sheltered bays helped the city grow in significance as a trading city. Much of New York is built on the three islands of Manhattan, Staten Island, and western Long Island, making land scarce and encouraging a high population density.The Hudson River flows from the Hudson Valley into New York Bay, becoming a tidal estuary that separates the Bronx and Manhattan from Northern New Jersey. The Harlem River, another tidal strait between the East and Hudson Rivers, separates Manhattan from the Bronx.

The boroughs of New York City straddle the border between two geologic provinces of eastern North America.  Brooklyn and Queens, located on Long Island, are part of the eastern coastal plain.  Long Island is a massive moraine which formed at the southern fringe of the Laurentide Ice Sheet during the last ice age.  The Bronx and Manhattan lie on the eastern edge of the Newark Basin, a block of the Earth's crust which sank downward during the disintegration of the supercontinent Pangaea during the Triassic period.  The Palisades Sill on the New Jersey shore of the Hudson River exposes ancient, once-molten rock that filled the basin.  Tough metamorphic rocks underlie much of Manhattan, providing solid support for its many skyscrapers.

The city's land has been altered considerably by human intervention, with substantial land reclamation along the waterfronts since Dutch colonial times. Reclamation is most notable in Lower Manhattan with modern developments like Battery Park City. Much of the natural variations in topography have been evened out, particularly in Manhattan. The West Side of Manhattan retains some hilliness, especially in Upper Manhattan, while the East Side has been considerably flattened. Duffy's Hill in East Harlem is one notable exception to the East Side's relatively level grade.

The city's land area is estimated to be . However, a more recent estimate calculates a total land area of 304.8 square miles (789.4 square kilometres). The highest natural point in the city is Todt Hill on Staten Island, which at 409.8 ft (124.9 m) above sea level is the highest hill on the Eastern Seaboard south of Maine. The summit of the ridge is largely covered in woodlands as part of the Staten Island Greenbelt. Many places have been identified as the geographic center of the city, including a plaque in the center of Queens Boulevard and 58th Street, in Woodside, Queens.

Adjacent counties

New York
Westchester County
Nassau County

New Jersey
Monmouth County
Middlesex County
Union County
Hudson County
Bergen County

Boroughs 

New York City comprises five boroughs, an unusual form of government used to administer the five constituent counties that make up the city. Throughout the boroughs there are hundreds of distinct neighborhoods, many with a definable history and character all their own. If the boroughs were each independent cities, four of the boroughs (Brooklyn, Queens, Manhattan, and the Bronx) would be among the ten most populous cities in the United States.

The Bronx (Bronx County, pop. 1,364,566) is New York City's northernmost borough. It is the birthplace of rap and hip hop culture, the site of Yankee Stadium, and home to the largest cooperatively owned housing complex in the United States, Co-op City. Except for a small piece of Manhattan known as Marble Hill, the Bronx is the only section of the city that is part of the North American mainland.
 Brooklyn (Kings County, pop. 2,511,408) is the city's most populous borough and was an independent city until 1898. Brooklyn is known for its cultural diversity, an independent art scene, distinct neighborhoods and a unique architectural heritage. The borough also features a long beachfront and Coney Island, famous as one of the earliest amusement grounds in the country.
 Manhattan (New York County, pop. 1,606,275) is the most densely populated borough and home to most of the city's skyscrapers. The borough contains the major business centers of the city and many cultural attractions. Manhattan is loosely divided into downtown, midtown, and uptown regions.
 Queens (Queens County, pop. 2,256,576) is geographically the largest borough and the most ethnically diverse county in the United States. Historically a collection of small towns and villages founded by the Dutch, the borough today is mainly residential and middle class, with enclaves of above average income and wealth. It is the only large county in the United States where the median income among African-American households, about $52,000 a year, has surpassed that of Caucasian households. Queens is the site of Citi Field and its predecessor Shea Stadium, the home of the New York Mets, and annually hosts the US Tennis Open.
 Staten Island (Richmond County, pop. 475,014) is the most suburban in character of the five boroughs. It is  connected to Brooklyn by the Verrazzano-Narrows Bridge and to Manhattan by the free Staten Island Ferry. Until 2001 the borough was home to the Fresh Kills Landfill, formerly the largest landfill in the world, which is now being reconstructed as Freshkills Park, one of the largest urban parks in the United States.

Environmental issues

New York City plays an important role in the green policy agenda because of its size. Environmental groups make large efforts to help shape legislation in New York because they see the strategy as an efficient way to influence national programs. New York City's economy is larger than Switzerland's, a size that means the city has potential to set new de facto standards. Manufacturers are also attuned to the latest trends and needs in the city because the market is simply too big to ignore.

Although cities like San Francisco or Portland, Oregon are most commonly associated with urban environmentalism in the United States, New York City's unique urban footprint and extensive transportation systems make it more sustainable than most American cities.

Maps and satellite images

See also 
 Climate change in New York City
 Geography of New York–New Jersey Harbor Estuary
 New York metropolitan area
 Northeast megalopolis
 New York City Audubon

References 
Notes

Sources

Further reading

The Vegan Guide to New York City, by Rynn Berry and Chris A. Suzuki
The Big Green Apple: Your Guide to Eco-Friendly Living in New York City, by Mathieu Fontaine
  John H. Betts The Minerals of New York City originally published in Rocks & Minerals magazine, Volume 84, No . 3 pages 204-252 (2009).

External links 
 Green Apple Map - Interactive green map of New York City's environmental resources.
 NYC Open Accessible Space Information System - Interactive mapping resource of open space in New York City.
 Council on the Environment of New York City (CENYC) - Privately funded citizens' organization in the Office of the Mayor of New York City.
 NYCityMap -  New York City Government interactive map